
Gmina Białobrzegi is an urban-rural gmina (administrative district) in Białobrzegi County, Masovian Voivodeship, in east-central Poland.

Villages
Apart from the town of Białobrzegi, Gmina Białobrzegi contains the villages and settlements of Brzeska Wola, Brzeźce, Budy Brankowskie, Dąbrówka, Jasionna, Kamień, Kolonia Brzeźce, Leopoldów, Mikówka, Okrąglik, Pohulanka, Stawiszyn, Sucha, Suski Młynek, Szczyty and Wojciechówka.

Neighbouring gminas
Gmina Białobrzegi is bordered by the gminas of Promna, Radzanów, Stara Błotnica, Stromiec, Warka and Wyśmierzyce.

References
Polish official population figures 2006

Bialobrzegi
Białobrzegi County